El Salvador is the smallest and the most densely populated country in Central America. El Salvador's capital and largest city is San Salvador. , the country had a population of approximately 6.83 million, consisting largely of Mestizos of European and Indigenous American descent.

El Salvador's economy was historically dominated by agriculture, beginning with the indigo plant (añil in Spanish), the most important crop during the colonial period, and followed thereafter by coffee, which by the early 20th century accounted for 90 percent of export earnings. El Salvador has since reduced its dependence on coffee and embarked on diversifying the economy by opening up trade and financial links and expanding the manufacturing sector. The colón, the official currency of El Salvador since 1892, was replaced by the U.S. dollar in 2001.

Notable firms 
This list includes notable companies with primary headquarters located in the country. The industry and sector follow the Industry Classification Benchmark taxonomy. Organizations which have ceased operations are included and noted as defunct.

See also

References 

El Salvador